Laufen Castle is a castle in the municipality of Laufen-Uhwiesen in the Swiss canton of Zurich.  It is a Swiss heritage site of national significance overlooking the Rhine Falls.

The first documented reference to the castle dates to the year 858 when it was the home of the Barons of Laufen. It passed through several owners until the Old Zürich War (1439–1450) when the castle was acquired by the Fulach family, from whom the city of Zurich bought the castle in 1544. Following the Helvetic Republic (1798–1803) the castle was once again in private ownership, with the city of Zurich reacquiring the castle by buying it again in 1941.

The castle now serves as a tourist attraction, and contains a restaurant and a youth hostel. Between 2009 and 2010 a project was undertaken to restore and expand the facilities, including a visitors’ centre situated in the former staff quarters, an exhibition in the northern part of the castle, and a wheelchair-accessible circular walkway with glass lift between castle and river levels. Laufen is overlooking Wörth Castle, on the opposite side of the Rhein river, in the Canton of Schaffhausen.

The Rheinfall railway line passes through a tunnel under the castle, halting at the Schloss Laufen am Rheinfall station to the south of the tunnel and beneath the castle walls. The station is linked to the castle by a walkway.

See also
 List of castles in Switzerland
 List of cultural property of national significance in Switzerland: Zürich

References

External links
 
 Official web site of Laufen Castle

 

Cultural property of national significance in the canton of Zürich
Castles in the canton of Zürich
Tourist attractions in the canton of Zürich